Quercus chihuahuensis, the Chihuahua oak, is a species of oak in the beech family. It is native to the region from extreme western Texas west to Sonora, Mexico, and south to Zacatecas and San Luis Potosí. It is one of the dominant species of the Sierra Madre Occidental in Chihuahua and Sonora.

The tree grows up to 10 m (33 ft) tall, very common in much of its range. The leaves are entire to toothed or sublobate, green on the top but yellow or gray on the underside because of a coating of velvety, stellate (star-shaped, highly branched) hairs. The species is related to Quercus arizonica and Quercus grisea, sometimes hybridizing with these two species in Texas.

References

chihuahuensis
Trees of the South-Central United States
Trees of Northeastern Mexico
Flora of Chihuahua (state)
Flora of Sonora
Flora of Texas
Flora of the Sierra Madre Occidental
Plants described in 1924
Taxa named by William Trelease